Noale is a town in the Metropolitan City of Venice, Veneto, Italy.

It is part of the Miranese district, together with the neighboring municipalities of Mirano, Santa Maria di Sala, Salzano, Scorzè, Spinea and Martellago.

The town is home to the thrash metal band Catarrhal Noise and the motorcycle manufacturer Aprilia.

Palio 
The Palio di Noale is the annual historical re-enactment of a medieval contest which was held under the seigniory of the Tempesta family. Historical documents show that the Palio was first celebrated in 1339, in occasion of Pentecost. It was originally intended to commemorate Noale's annexation to Treviso's possessions.

The modern Palio takes place in the month of June, over the Pentecost period, and sees the participation of different teams, coming from the surrounding areas as well. More specifically, the main contest involves the following seven districts: Bastia, Cerva, Drago, Gato, S. Giorgio, S.Giovanni and S.Urbano. In accordance with the historical tradition, the winner of the contest is awarded with a drape designed by local artists.

Sister cities
 Dilijan, Armenia (since July 2011)

References

External links

Cities and towns in Veneto